The Prix Décembre, originally known as the Prix Novembre, is one of France's premier literary awards. It was founded under the name Prix Novembre in 1989 by Philippe Dennery (Michel Dennery, according to other sources). In 1998, the founder resigned after he disapproved awarding of the prize to Michel Houellebecq's novel Atomised. The prize then got a new patron – Pierre Bergé – and a new name: Prix Decembre.

Winners:
 Prix Novembre:
1989 – Guy Dupré, Les Manoeuvres d'automne
1990 – François Maspero, Les Passagers du Roissy-Express
1991 – Raphaël Confiant, Eau de café
1992 – Henri Thomas, La Chasse au trésor and Roger Grenier, Regardez la neige qui tombe
1993 – René de Obaldia. Exobiographie
1994 – Jean Hatzfeld, L'Air de guerre and Éric Holder, La Belle Jardinière
1995 – Jean Échenoz, Les Grandes Blondes
1996 – Régis Debray, Loués soient nos seigneurs: une éducation politique
1997 – Lydie Salvayre, La Compagnie des spectres
1998 – Michel Houellebecq, Les Particules élémentaires
 Prix Decembre:
1999 – Claude Askolovitch, Voyage au bout de la France: Le Front National tel qu'il est
2000 – Anthony Palou, Camille
2001 – Chloé Delaume, Le Cri du sablier
2002 – Pierre Michon, Abbés and Corps du Roi
2003 – Régis Jauffret, Univers, univers
2004 – Philippe Forest, Sarinagara
2005 – Charles Dantzig, Dictionnaire égoïste de la littérature française
2006 – Pierre Guyotat, Coma
2007 – Yannick Haenel, Cercle
2008 – Mathias Énard, Zone
2009 – Jean-Philippe Toussaint, La Vérité sur Marie
2010 – Frédéric Schiffter, Philosophie sentimentale
2011 – Jean-Christophe Bailly, Le Dépaysement. Voyages en France & Olivier Frébourg, Gaston et Gustave
2012 – Mathieu Riboulet, Les Œuvres de miséricorde
2013 – Maël Renouard, La Réforme de l'opéra de Pékin
2014 - Elisabeth Roudinesco, Sigmund Freud, en son temps et dans le nôtre
2015 - Christine Angot, Un amour impossible
2016 - Alain Blottière, Comment Baptiste est mort, Gallimard
2017 - Grégoire Bouillier, Le Dossier M, Flammarion
2018 - Michael Ferrier, François, portrait d’un absent, Gallimard
2019 - ,	Les Grands Cerfs, Grasset
2020 - Grégory Le Floch, Parcourir le monde et d'y rôder, Christian Bourgois
2021 - , Le Poulailler métaphysique, Le Pommier

References 

Decembre
Awards established in 1989
1989 establishments in France